Rinaldo Botti (1658 in Florence – March 31, 1740 in Florence) was an Italian painter active in the Baroque period. He was a pupil of Jacopo Chiavistelli, and specialized in quadratura. He collaborated with Andrea Landini in frescoing some salons of Villas belonging to the Corsini family.  He painted the ceiling of Santa Elisabetta delle Convertite.

In other projects, he collaborated with Alessandro Gherardini, Filippo Maria Galleti, Giovanni Andrea Brunori, and Giovanni Sacconi.

In the palace of Francesco Maria Niccolò Gabburri on via Ghibellina, he worked with Lorenzo del Moro in decorating some murals (1708). With the same artist he worked (1702) in the piano nobile of the Palazzo Incontri. With Andrea Landini in 1700, he helped paint the wall decorations of the Villa Feroni. Stucco decoration was added by Giovanni Battista Ciceri.

He also worked in Pescia, for example in the Oratory della Misericordia (1702), the nave of Santa Maria Maddalena, the Oratory of San Biagio,  the church of Santa Maria Nuova, the Casa Galeffi, and the theater of the Accademici Cheti.

He performed some decoration with a team including Giuseppe Tonelli, Lorenzo Del Moro, Stefano Papi, and Landini in 1703 for the Cardinal Francesco de Medici, in decorating the Villa di Lappeggi. With Del Moro in 1705, he decorated the quadratura for the church of San Domenico in Fiesole.

References
 Quadraturismo entry

1658 births
1740 deaths
17th-century Italian painters
Italian male painters
18th-century Italian painters
Painters from Florence
Italian Baroque painters
Quadratura painters
18th-century Italian male artists